Feustmann Cottage is a historic cure cottage located at Saranac Lake in the town of Harrietstown, Franklin County, New York.  It was built in 1923 and is a two-story, gambrel roofed wood frame residence with shed dormers in the front and back.  It features three cure porches and is in the Colonial Revival style.

It was listed on the National Register of Historic Places in 1992.

References

Houses on the National Register of Historic Places in New York (state)
Colonial Revival architecture in New York (state)
Houses completed in 1923
Houses in Franklin County, New York
National Register of Historic Places in Franklin County, New York